Demetrio Alonso Castrillo (22 December 1841 – 30 November 1916) was a Spanish politician and lawyer.

Born in Valderas, he was Minister of the Interior during the reign of Alfonso XIII

A member of the Liberal Party, he was elected successively between 1881 and 1905 and became the Congress deputy for León (province).

He served as Minister of the Interior from 2 January to 3 April 1911 in the cabinet of José Canalejas.

1841 births
1916 deaths
People from the Province of León
Liberal Party (Spain, 1880) politicians
Government ministers of Spain
Members of the Congress of Deputies (Spain)
Interior ministers of Spain
Civil governors of Madrid